India is currently competing in the 2021 Summer Deaflympics which is held in Caxias do Sul, Brazil. India sent a delegation consisting of 65 participants in 11 sporting disciplines such as shooting, badminton, athletics, golf, judo, karate, table tennis, tennis, taekwondo, wrestling for the event, which is also the largest ever delegation sent by India in a single Summer Deaflympic event.

This was the 14th time that India had participated at the Summer Deaflympics since making its Deaflympic debut in 1965. The delegation included Rohit Bhaker, who competed in his 7th Deaflympic event as the most experienced competitor for India at the multi-sport event. Golfer Diksha Dagar who competed at the 2020 Summer Olympics also returned to Deaflympics after appearing previously at the 2017 Summer Deaflympics.

India rank 9th in the event which includes Sports shooter Dhanush Srikanth won the first medal as well as first gold medal for India during the event as he clinched a gold medal in the men's 10m air rifle shooting event with a new deaf world record by registering a score of 247.5 points in the final.

Medalists

Medal table

References

External links 

 India at the Deaflympics

2022 in Indian sport
India at the Deaflympics
Nations at the 2021 Summer Deaflympics